Aljaž Džankić (born 19 March 2002) is a Croatian professional footballer who plays as a defender for USL Championship club Sporting Kansas City II.

Career
In 2019, Džankić joined the youth academy of Italian Serie A side Udinese from the youth academy of Maribor, Slovenia's most successful club.

In 2020, he signed for Aluminij in the Slovenian top flight.

On 4 March 2021, Džankić joined USL Championship side Sporting Kansas City II.

References

External links
 
 

Living people
2002 births
Croatian people of Slovenian descent
Slovenian people of Croatian descent
Croatian footballers
Slovenian footballers
Croatia youth international footballers
Association football defenders
NK Aluminij players
Sporting Kansas City II players
Slovenian PrvaLiga players
Croatian expatriate footballers
Croatian expatriate sportspeople in Italy
Croatian expatriate sportspeople in Slovenia
Croatian expatriate sportspeople in the United States
Expatriate footballers in Italy
Expatriate footballers in Slovenia
Expatriate soccer players in the United States
USL Championship players
MLS Next Pro players